Follow Me... is the debut album by Crispian St. Peters and was released in 1966.

The album featured four singles: "You Were on My Mind", which reached number 2 in the UK and number 36 on the American Billboard Hot 100, "The Pied Piper", which reached number 4 in the UK and number 5 in the US, "But She's Untrue", whose B-side, "Your Ever Changin' Mind", reached number 106 in the US, and "So Long", which did not chart.
The song "You Were on My Mind" was originally recorded and released in 1964 by Ian & Sylvia, and was a major hit in the US when covered by the group We Five in 1965.

Track listing
All songs written and composed by Crispian St. Peters except where noted.
 "Your Love Has Gone" – 3:41
 "Jilly Honey" – 2:16
 "When We Meet" – 3:33
 "My Little Brown Eyes" – 2:45
 "It's a Funny Feeling" – 1:53
 "So Long" – 3:31
 "You Were on My Mind" (Sylvia Fricker) – 2:43
 "But She's Untrue" – 3:09
 "Goodbye to You" – 2:41
 "Willingly" – 3:45
 "Without You" – 2:19
 "That's the Way I Feel" – 2:22
 "That Little Chain" – 2:36
 "The Pied Piper" (Steve Duboff, Artie Kornfeld) – 2:33

Personnel

Musicians
 Crispian St. Peters – guitar, vocals
 Alan Parker – guitar
 Big Jim Sullivan – guitar
 Dan Sandford – guitar
 Jimmy Page – guitar
 Vic Flick – guitar
 Harry Stoneham – piano, organ
 Ronnie Seabrook – bass
 Russ Stableford – bass
 Rex Bennett – drums
 Jim Lawless – percussion
 Eddie Mordue – piccolo, flute
 Don Honeywill – saxophone

Technnical
 David Nicolson  – producer
 Gerald Chevin  – engineer 
 Roger Cameron  – engineer 
 Tony Pike – engineer (track 6)
 Barrie Wentzell – photography
 Kit Wells – liner notes

Charts

Singles

References

1966 debut albums
Decca Records albums